Alain is widely used as a personal name and is the French form of Alan but also exists in English-speaking countries:

A
Alain Absire (born 1950), French writer
Alain Acard (born 1951), French sprint canoeist
Alain Alivon (born 1965), French military and drill instructor
Alain Altinoglu (born 1975), French-Armenian conductor
Alain Ambrosino (born 1951), French rally driver
Alain Amougou (born 1973), Cameroonian footballer
Alain Anderton, British author of business studies and economics textbooks
Alain Anen (born 1950), Luxembourgian fencer
Alain Andji (born 1974), French pole vaulter
Alain André, Canadian politician and a City Councillor in Montreal, Quebec
Alain Anziani (born 1951), member of the Senate of France, representing the Gironde department
Alain Aoun (born 1971), Lebanese politician and nephew of President Michel Aoun
Alain Arroyo (born 1982), Spanish footballer and manager
Alain Aspect (born 1947), French physicist
Alain Akouala Atipault (born 1959), Congolese politician
Alain Attalah (born 1964), Egyptian basketball player
Alain Auderset (born 1968), Swiss Christian author of comic books
Alain Ayissi (born 1962), Cameroonian cyclist
Alain Ayroles (born 1968), French author, playwright, screenwriter, and translator

B
Alain Baclet (born 1986), French footballer
Alain Badiou (born 1937), French philosopher
Alain Bailey (born 1987), Jamaican long jumper
Alain Bancquart (born 1934), French composer
Alain Baraton (born 1957), French gardener
Alain Baroja (born 1989), Venezuelan football goalkeeper
Alain Barrau (1947–2021), French politician
Alain Barrière (1935–2019), French singer
Alain Barudoni (born 1940), Swiss fencer
Alain Bashung (1947–2009), French singer, songwriter and actor
Alain Bauer, (born 1962), French criminologist
Alain Baumann (born 1966), Swiss footballer
Alain Baxter (born 1973), Scottish professional skier
Alain Beaulé (born 1946), Canadian ice hockey player
Alain Bédé (born 1970), Ivorian footballer
Alain Behi (born 1978), French-Ivorian football player
Alain Bejjani (born 1973), Lebanese businessman
Alain Bélanger, Canadian professional hockey player
Alain J. P. Belda, Chairman of the Board of Alcoa since January 2001
Alain Bellemare (born 1962), Canadian businessman
Alain Bellouis (born 1947), French cyclist
Jacques-Alain Bénisti (born 1952), member of the National Assembly of France
Alain Benoit (born 1948), French physicist
Alain Bensoussan (born 1940), French mathematician
Alain Berbérian (1953–2017), French-Armenian film director and writer
Alain Bergala (born 1943), French film critic, essayist, screenwriter, and director
Alain Berger (born 1990), Swiss ice hockey player
Alain Berger, Swiss orienteering competitor
Alain Bergeron (born 1950), Canadian science fiction author and political scientist
Alain Berliner (born 1963), Belgian director best known for the 1997 film Ma vie en rose
Alain Bernard (born 1983), French swimmer from Aubagne, Bouches-du-Rhône
Alain Bernaud (1932–2020), French composer
Alain Bernheim (1922–2009), French-American film producer and literary agent
Alain Bernheim (born 1931), French musician and Masonic researcher
Alain Berset (born 1972), President of the Swiss Council of States
Alain Billiet (born 1951), the alleged designer of the euro sign (€)
Paul Alain Bingan (born 1987), Cameroonian professional footballer
Alain Blanchard (born 1419), commander of the crossbowmen of Touent during the Hundred Years' War
Alain Blondel (born 1962), retired French decathlete
Alain Bocquet (born 1946), member of the National Assembly of France
Alain Boghossian (born 1970), retired Armenian-French football player
Alain Boire (born 1971), Canadian politician
Yve-Alain Bois (born 1952), historian and critic of modern art
Alain Bombard (1924–2005), French biologist, physician and politician
Alain Bondue (born 1959), France cyclist
Alain Boublil, librettist who worked with the composer Claude-Michel Schönberg
Alain Bouchard, Canadian businessman
Jean-Alain Boumsong (born 1979), Cameroonian professional football defender
Alain Bravo, French electrical engineer and entrepreneur

C
Alain Cacheux (born 1947), member of the National Assembly of France
Alain Calmat (born 1940), French former competitive figure skater, surgeon, and politician
Alain Cantareil (born 1983), French footballer
Alain Caron (1938–1986), Canadian professional ice hockey player
Alain Caron (born 1955), Canadian jazz musician and bass player
Alain F. Carpentier M.D. Ph.D. (born 1933), French heart surgeon
Alain Casanova (born 1961), football former goalkeeper and manager
Alain Cavalier (born 1931), French film director
Alain Caveglia (born 1968), French football retired striker
Alain Cayzac (born 1941), French advertising agent
Alain Chabat (born 1958), French Jewish actor and director
Alain Chamfort (born 1949), French singer of Breton origin
Alain Chapel (1937–1990), French Michelin 3 starred chef
Alain Chartier (1392–1430), French poet and political writer
Michel-Eustache-Gaspard-Alain Chartier de Lotbinière (1748–1822), seigneur and political figure in Lower Canada
Alain Chatillon (born 1943), member of the Senate of France
Alain Chevrier (born 1961), retired Canadian ice hockey goaltender
Alain Claeys (born 1948), member of the National Assembly of France
Alain Clark (born 1979), Dutch musician and producer
Alain Colmerauer (1941-2017), French computer scientist
Alain Connes (born 1947), French mathematician
Alain Corbin, French historian, specialist of the 19th century in France
Alain Corneau (born 1943), French movie director and writer
Alain Côté (born 1957), professional ice hockey player for the Quebec Nordiques
Alain Côté (born 1967), former professional ice hockey player and Roller Hockey player
Alain Couriol (born 1958), former French football striker
Alain Courtois (born 1951), Belgian politician
Alain Cousin (born 1947), member of the National Assembly of France
Marie-Alain Couturier (1897–1954), French Dominican friar, designer of stained glass windows
Alain Cuny (1908–1994), French actor

D
Alain Daigle (born 1954), former professional ice hockey forward
Alain Daniélou (1907–1994), French historian, intellectual, musicologist, Indologist, and convert to Shaivite Hinduism
Alain de Benoist (born 1943), French academic, philosopher, founder of the Nouvelle Droite
Alain de Boissieu (1914–2006), French general, son-in-law of general Charles de Gaulle
Alain de Botton, (born 1969), British writer and television producer
Alain de Cadenet (born 1945), on-air personality for the SPEED Channel and ESPN
Alain de Changy (1922–1994), Belgian racing driver
Alain de Coëtivy (1407–1474), prelate from a Breton noble family
Alain Emmanuel de Coëtlogon (1646–1730), Marshal of France during the reign of Louis XIV and Louis XV
Alain Huetz de Lemps, French geographer and botanist
Alain de Lille (1128–1202), French theologian and poet
Alain de Mijolla (born 1933), French psychoanalyst and psychiatrist
Alain de Royer-Dupré (born 1944), French racehorse trainer
Alain de Solminihac (1593–1659), French Catholic religious reformer and bishop of Cahors
Alain-Philippe Malagnac d'Argens de Villèle (1951–2000), the adopted son of French writer Roger Peyrefitte
Alain Decaux (born 1925), French historian
Alain Defossé (1957-2017), French novelist and translator
Alain Delon (born 1935), César Award-winning French actor
Alain Demurger, modern French historian, specialist of the history of the Knights Templar and the Crusades
Alain Deneef, Belgian businessman
Alain Desrosières, French statistician at the INSEE and a sociologist and historian of science at the EHESS 
Alain Destexhe, Belgian liberal politician
Alain Desvergnes (1931–2020), French photographer
Alain Digbeu (born 1975), French professional basketball player
Étienne Alain Djissikadié (born 1977), Gabonese footballer
Pierre-Alain Donnier, Swiss journalist, died while reporting from Tchad in 1988
Alain Dorval (born 1946), French voice actor born in Algiers
Alain Dostie (born 1943), Canadian cinematographer, film director and screenwriter
Alain Dubuc, Canadian journalist and an economist 
Alain Ducasse (born 1956), Monégasque chef
Alain Dufaut (born 1944), member of the Senate of France, representing the Vaucluse department
Alain Duhamel (born 1940), French journalist and political commentator

E
Alain Michel Ekoue, Cameroonian football player
Alain Elkann (born 1950), Italian novelist and journalist of Jewish descent
Alain Enthoven (born 1930), Deputy Assistant Secretary of Defense from 1961 to 1965
Alain Escoffier (1949–1977), French anti-communist activist and martyr
Alain Etchegoyen (1951–2007), French philosopher and novelist
Alain Eyobo (born 1961), retired Cameroonian professional football forward
Alain Erlande-Brandenburg (born 1937), French art historian and archivist

F
Jean-Alain Fanchone (born 1988), French footballer
Alain Fauconnier (born 1945), French politician and a member of the Senate of France
Alain Ferry (born 1952), member of the National Assembly of France
Alain Ferté (born 1955), French professional racing driver
Alain Figaret, French luxury shirt brand launched in 1968 by Alain Figaret
Alain Finkielkraut (born 1949), French essayist, and son of a Jewish Polish artisan
Alain Fouché (born 1942), French politician and a member of the Senate of France
Alain Fournier (1943–2000), computer graphics researcher
Alain Frachon (born 1950), French journalist 
Pierre-Alain Frau, (born 1980), French football forward

G
Alain Bernat Gallego (born 1971), Andorran politician
Alain Garant (born 1952), Liberal party member of the Canadian House of Commons
Alain Gaspoz (born 1970), Beninese football player who, is playing for FC Bagnes
Alain Geiger (born 1960), retired Swiss international football defender and current manager
Alain Gerbault (1893–1941), French aviator, tennis champion and sailor
Alain Gest (born 1950), French politician
Alain Gheerbrant (1920–2013), French writer, editor, poet and explorer
Alain Giletti (born 1939), French figure skater
Alain Giresse (born 1952), French professional football (soccer) midfielder
Alain Glavieux (died 2004), French professor in electrical engineering 
Alain Goma (born 1972), former football player
Alain Goraguer (born 1931), French jazz pianist, sideman of Boris Vian and Serge Gainsbourg, arranger and composer
Alain Gouaméné (born 1966), former football goalkeeper from Côte d'Ivoire
Alain Gournac (born 1943), French politician and a member of the Senate of France
Alain Grandbois, CC (1900–1975), Quebecer poet born in Saint-Casimir, Quebec
Alain Guionnet (born 1954), French revisionist and a left-wing activist

H
Alain Haché (born 1970), experimental physicist and associate professor at the University of Moncton, Canada
Alain Hamer (born 1965), Luxembourgian football referee
Alain Héroux (born 1964), former professional ice hockey left winger
Alain Hertoghe (born 1959), Belgian journalist who worked for the French Catholic newspaper La Croix
Alain Houpert (born 1957), French politician and a member of the Senate of France
Alain Hutchinson (born 1949), Belgian politician and Member of the European Parliament

J
Alain Jacquet (1939–2008), French artist representative of the American Pop Art movement
Alain Jessua (1932–2017), French film director and screenwriter
Alain Johannes (born 1962), guitarist and member of the band Eleven
Alain Johns, fictional gunslinger in Stephen King's Dark Tower series of novels
Alain Joly, French businessman
Georges-Alain Jones (born 1975), French singer
Alain Joyandet (born 1954), French politician
Alain Juppé (born 1945), French right-wing politician, Prime Minister of France from 1995 to 1997

K
Alain Kashama (born 1979), professional Canadian footballer
Alain Muana Kizamba, goalkeeper from the Democratic Republic of the Congo
Alain Koffi (born 1983), French professional basketball player
Alain Koudou (born 1984), Ivorian football striker
Alain Krivine (born 1941), leader of the Trotskyist movement in France

L
Alain Lamassoure (born 1944), French politician and Member of the European Parliament
Alain Lambert (born 1946), French politician
Alain Le Boulluec, contemporary French patristics scholar
Alain Le Bussy (born 1947), prolific Belgian author of science fiction
Alain Le Vern (born 1948), French Socialist Senator, president of the Haute-Normandie region
Alain Lebas (born 1953), French sprint canoeist
Alain Paul Lebeaupin (1945–2021), French Archbishop
Alain Lefèvre (born 1962), Québécois pianist and composer
Alain Lemercier (born 1957), retired male race walker from France
Alain Lemieux (born 1962), retired ice hockey player
Alain Lequeux (1947–2006), French jockey
Alain-René Lesage (1668–1747), French novelist and playwright
Alain Lestié (born 1944), French painter and writer
Alain A. Lewis (born 1947), American mathematician
Alain Lipietz (born 1947), French engineer, economist, politician, member of the French Green Party
Alain Liri (born 1979), Côte d'Ivoire footballer
Alain Locke (1885–1954), American writer, philosopher, educator, and patron of the arts
Alain Lombard (born 1940), French conductor

M
Alain Mabanckou (born 1966), author and journalist
Alain Maca, retired American soccer defender, President of the JFK International Air Terminal
Alain Madelin (born 1946), French politician and former minister
Alain Mafart, French military officer
Alain Mamou-Mani, French film producer and writer
Alain Manesson Mallet (1630–1706), French cartographer and engineer
Alain Marc (born 1957), member of the National Assembly of France
Alain Marion (1938–1998), French flautist
Alain Marleix (born 1946), Secretary of State for Veterans in the government of François Fillon from 2007 to 2008
Alain Marty (born 1946), member of the National Assembly of France
Alain Masudi (born 1978), Congolese football player
Alain Maury, French astronomer
Edgar Alain Mebe Ngo'o (born 1957), Cameroonian political figure
Alain Menu (born 1963), Swiss racing driver
Alain Merchadier (born 1952), French retired professional football defender
Alain Mesili, political activist in France during the 1968 disturbances
Alain Meslet (born 1950), French professional road bicycle racer
Alain Meunier (born 1942), French cellist
Alain Mikli (born 1955), French designer of high-end handmade eyeglasses and accessories
Jacques-Alain Miller, prominent French Lacanian psychoanalyst
Alain Milon (born 1947), member of the Senate of France
Alain Mimoun (born 1921), French Olympic marathon champion
Alain Moizan (born 1953), French retired professional football midfielder
Alain Moka (born 1954), Congolese politician
Alain Moyne-Bressand (born 1945), member of the National Assembly of France
Pierre-Alain Muet (born 1945), member of the National Assembly of France

N
Alain Nasreddine (born 1975), professional ice hockey defenceman
Alain Ndizeye (born 1986), Burundian football defender
Alain Ndjoubi Ossami, Gabonese politician and economist
Alain Nef (born 1982), Swiss football defender
Alain Néri (born 1942), member of the National Assembly of France
Alain Ngalani (born 1975), Cameroonian two-time Muay Thai kickboxing world champion
Alain Nkong (born 1979), Cameroonian football midfielder

O
Alain Junior Ollé Ollé (born 1987), Cameroonian professional footballer

P
Alain Paquet (born 1961), Canadian politician, teacher and economist
Alain Pasquier (born 1942), French art historian specialising in ancient Greek art, museography and conservation
Alain Passard (born 1956), French chef and owner of the three star restaurant L'Arpège in Paris
Alain Payet (1947–2007), French director of Nazi exploitation and chic porn movies
Alain Pellegrini (born 1946), French général de Division
Alain Perrin (born 1956), French football manager and former footballer
Alain Peyrefitte (1925–1999), French scholar and politician
Alain Poher (1909–1996), French centrist politician
Alain Poiré (1917–2000), French film producer and screenwriter
Alain Pons (born 1995), Gibraltarian footballer
Alain Pompidou (born 1942), French scientist and politician
Alain Portes (born 1961), French handball player
Alain Portmann (born 1981), Swiss football goalkeeper
Alain Prost (born 1955), French racing driver; Four Time Formula One World Champion
Alain Provost, French Landscape Architect

Q
Marc-Alain Ouaknin (born 1957), French rabbi and philosopher

R
Alain Raguel (born 1976), French football player
Alain Rakotondramanana (born 1970), Malagasy footballer
Alain Ramadier (born 1958), French politician
Alain Rayes (born 1971), Canadian politician
Alain Razahasoa (born 1966), Malagasy long-distance runner
Alain Rémond (born 1946), French humor columnist
Alain Resnais (born 1922), French New Wave film director
Alain Rey (born 1928), French linguist, lexicographer and radio personality
Alain Rey (born 1982), Swiss ski mountaineer
Alain Richard (born 1945), French politician
Alain Richard (born 1985), Swiss ski mountaineer
Alain Robbe-Grillet (1922–2008), French writer and filmmaker
Alain Robert (born 1962), French rock and urban climber
Alain Robidoux (born 1960), Canadian snooker player
Alain Roca (born 1976), retired volleyball player from Cuba
Alain Rochat (born 1983), Swiss footballer
Alain Roche, former French football defender
Alain Rohr (born 1971), Swiss athlete who specializes in the 400 metres hurdles
Alain Rolland (born 1966), former Irish rugby union footballer and current international referee
Alain Romans (1905–1988), French jazz composer
Alain Rousset (born 1951), the Socialist president of the Aquitaine region of France

S
Alain Sailhac, Executive Vice President and Dean Emeritus at the French Culinary Institute in New York City
Alain Saint-Ogan (1895–1974), French comics author and artist
Alain Sarde (born 1952), French film producer and actor
Alain Sars (born 1961), retired French professional football referee
Alain Savary (1918–1988), French Socialist politician
Alain Schmitt (born 1983), French judoka
Alain Schultz (born 1983), Swiss association footballer
Alain Senderens, leading French chef credited as one of the founders of Nouvelle Cuisine
Alain Sergile, Haitian swimmer who lived in Roswell, Georgia
Alain Silver, US film and music producer, and reviewer, historian and writer on film topics, especially film noir and horror films
Alain Simard (businessman), President and CEO of L'Équipe Spectra since its inception in 1977
Alain Soral (born 1958), French sociologist, essayist, and film maker, as well as being the author of several polemical essays
Alain Souchon (born 1944), French singer, songwriter and actor
Alain Suguenot (born 1951), member of the National Assembly of France
Alain Suied (1951–2008), French poet and translator
Alain Supiot, French legal scholar
Alain Sutter (born 1968), Swiss football player
Alain Sylvestre (born 1979), professional Canadian kickboxer

T
Alain Tabourian, Lebanese politician of Armenian origin
Alain Tanner (born 1929), Swiss film director
Alain Taravella (born 1948), French billionaire
Alain Tardif (born 1946), Liberal party member of the Canadian House of Commons
Alain Touraine (born 1925), French sociologist born in Hermanville-sur-Mer
Alain Touwaide (born 1953), Belgian historian of medicine and sciences currently researching at the Smithsonian Institution, Washington D. C.
Alain Traoré (born 1988), Burkinabé football (soccer) midfielder
Alain Trudel (born 1966), Canadian musician, composer and conductor
Alain Turnier, Haitian historian

V
Alain Vanzo (1928–2002), French opera singer and composer
Alain Vasselle (born 1947), member of the Senate of France representing the Oise department
Alain Vasseur (born 1948), French professional road bicycle racer
Alain Viala (1947–2021), professor of French Literature at the University of Oxford and the University of Paris III
Alain Vidalies (born 1951), member of the National Assembly of France
Alain Vigneault (born 1961), the head coach of the Vancouver Canucks of the NHL
Alain Vivien (born 1938), French Socialist Party (PS) politician

W
Alain Weill (born 1946), French art critic, expert in graphic design and advertising
Alain Wertheimer (1949), French businessman who owns a controlling interest in the House of Chanel with his brother Gerard
Alain Whyte (pronounced Alan) (born 1967), English guitarist, singer, and songwriter
Alain Wicki, Swiss skeleton racer
Alain Williams (born 1954), British sprint canoeist

Y
Alain Bédouma Yoda (born 1951), Burkinabé politician and Minister of State for Foreign Affairs and Regional Cooperation

Z
Alain Zoubga (born 1953), medical doctor and politician in Burkina Faso

Other
Alain, bishop of Auxerre (died 1185), Cistercian abbot and bishop of Auxerre from 1152 to 1167
Alain I of Albret (1440–1522), powerful French aristocrat
Alain-Fournier (1886–1914), the pseudonym of Henri Alban-Fournier, French author and soldier

Fictional characters
Alain, recurring character in the Pokémon anime series
Alain, a recurring character in tokusatsu series Kamen Rider Ghost
 Alain van Versch, a fictional character played by Matthias Schoenaerts in Rust and Bone

See also
 Alain (surname)

French masculine given names